Mission San José del Cabo (est. 1730) was the southernmost of the Jesuit missions on the Baja California peninsula, located near the modern city of San José del Cabo in Baja California Sur, Mexico. The mission was dedicated to Saint Joseph.

The southern cape of the Baja California peninsula had been an often-visited landmark for Spanish navigators (as well as English privateers) for nearly two centuries when a mission was finally established at the Pericú settlement of Añuití in 1730 by Nicolá Tamaral. The Río San José, or San José River, stops just shy of the ocean, with a one km long sand bar creating an estuary, the third largest in Mexico. This pooling of brackish water has created an oasis in the surrounding Sarcocaule desert. For more than 250 years it has furnished drinking and irrigation water for the town of San Jose del Cabo, beginning as a source of fresh water for Spanish galleons traveling back from the Philippines. Over the sand bar from the estuary is a bay referred to by early Spanish explorers, including Sebastian Vizcaino, as the Bahía de San Bernabé or Bay of San Bernabé (now the Bay of San José del Cabo). Initially located near the beach, the station was subsequently moved inland about 8 kilometers. The mission was founded in 1730 on the west bank of the nearby Río San José, and its full name is taken for the life-giving freshwater estuary.

In 1734 the Pericú Revolt broke out, Tamaral was killed, and the mission was destroyed. In 1735–1736, the reestablished outpost was moved back closer to the coast, but it served as a visita for Mission Santiago and as the site of a Spanish presidio. In 1753, San José del Cabo was again moved inland. In 1795, under the Dominicans, the surviving native population of Mission Santiago was transferred to San José del Cabo. The mission was finally closed in 1840.

See also
Los Cabos Municipality
 List of Jesuit sites

References

Further reading
 Vernon, Edward W. 2002. Las Misiones Antgi: The Spanish Missions of Baja California, 1683–1855. Viejo Press, Santa Barbara, California.

Estero de las Palmas
Los Cabos Municipality (Baja California Sur)
1730 establishments in New Spain
1840 disestablishments in Mexico